Good Times is a 1970s American sitcom.

Good Times or Goodtimes may also refer to:

Film and television

Film 
 Good Times (film), a 1967 film starring Sonny & Cher
 Goodtimes Enterprises, a British film production company
 GoodTimes Entertainment, a home video distributor

Television 
 Good Times (TV channel), an Indian lifestyle channel
 Good Times, a 2015 Chinese television series starring Hu Ge
 Justin Lee Collins: Good Times, a British television chat show

Literature 
 The Good Times (short story collection), a 1998 book by James Kelman
 Good Times, a 1969 poetry collection by Lucille Clifton
 Good Times!, a 2009 autobiography by Justin Lee Collins

Music
 Good Times (musical), a 1920 Broadway musical
 Good Times, a sound system founded by DJ Norman Jay

Albums
 Good Times (Adam Rickitt album) or the title song, 1999
 Good Times (Bagdad Cafe the Trench Town album), 2006
 Good Times (Charlie Robison album) or the title song, 2004
 Good Times (Elvis Presley album), 1974
 Good Times (Kim Dotcom album) or the title song, 2014
 Good Times (Kool & the Gang album) or the title song, 1972
 Good Times (Shakey Jake album) or the title song, 1960
 Good Times (Shocking Blue album), 1974
 Good Times (Subway album) or the title song, 1995
 Good Times (Wanda Jackson album), 1980
 Good Times (Willie Nelson album) or the title song, 1968
 Good Times (soundtrack), by Sonny & Cher, or the title song, from the 1967 film
 Good Times!, by the Monkees, 2016
 Good Times: The Very Best of the Hits & the Remixes, by Chic and Sister Sledge, or the title song by Chic (see below), 2005
 The Good Times, by Afroman, 2001
 The Good Times (Neil Sedaka album) or the title song, 1986
 Good Times, by Mando Diao, 2017
 The Good Times, by José Hoebee, or the title song, 1982
 Goodtimes, an EP by the Beautiful Girls, 2002

Songs
 "Good Times" (All Time Low song), 2017
 "Good Times" (CDB song), 1997
 "Good Times" (Chic song), 1979
 "Good Times" (Easybeats song), 1968; covered by Jimmy Barnes and INXS (1986) and others
 "Good Times" (Ella Eyre song), 2015
 "Good Times" (Eric Burdon and the Animals song), 1967
 "Good Times" (Finger Eleven song), 2003
 "Good Times" (Hoodoo Gurus song), 1987
 "Good Times" (Roll Deep song), 2010
 "Good Times" (Sam Cooke song), 1964; covered by Dan Seals (1990) and others
 "Good Times" (Styles P song), 2002
 "Good Times" (Tommy Lee song), 2005
 "Good Times (Better Times)", by Cliff Richard, 1969
 "Good Times", by Dannii Minogue from Club Disco, 2007
 "Good Times", by Ed Case featuring Skin, 2002
 "Good Times", by Edie Brickell from Picture Perfect Morning, 1994
 "Good Times", by Ex Hex from It's Real, 2019
 "Good Times", by Ghali, 2020
 "Good Times", by Harry Nilsson from Spotlight on Nilsson, 1966
 "Good Times", by the Jacksons from The Jacksons, 1976
 "Good Times", by Jerry Butler, 1965
 "Good Times", by Krokus from Stampede, 1990
 "Good Times", by Marcy Playground, 2009
 "Good Times", by Mario from Dancing Shadows, 2018
 "Good Times", by Matt Bianco from Indigo, 1988
 "Good Times", by S Club 7 from Sunshine, 2001
 "Good Times", by September from In Orbit, 2005
 "Good Times", by the Stone Roses from Second Coming, 1994
 "Good Times", by Wall of Voodoo from Dark Continent, 1981
 "Good Times", the theme song from the American sitcom, performed by Jim Gilstrap and Blinky, 1974
 "(Gonna Be) Good Times", by Gene Chandler, 1965
"I Know There's Gonna Be (Good Times)", by Jamie xx, 2015

Periodicals
 Good Times (magazine), a music and entertainment newspaper in Long Island, New York
 Good Times (newspaper), a free-circulation weekly published in Santa Cruz, California
  San Francisco Express Times, published as Good Times from 1969 to 1972, a counterculture tabloid underground newspaper

Other uses 
 Goodtimes virus, also referred to as Good Times, an emailed virus hoax  
 Good Times Burgers & Frozen Custard, a fast-food chain based in Colorado, US

See also 
 Good Time (disambiguation)
 Good Times Bad Times (disambiguation)
 Good Times, Wonderful Times, a 1965 film